Hot R&B/Hip-Hop Songs is a chart published by Billboard that ranks the top-performing songs in the United States in African-American-oriented musical genres; the chart has undergone various name changes since its launch in 1942 to reflect the evolution of such genres.  The chart returned in the issue of Billboard dated January 30, 1965, having not been published since the issue dated November 23, 1963.  No official explanation has ever been given as to why Billboard ceased producing R&B charts.  Chart historian Joel Whitburn has contended that "there was so much crossover of titles between the R&B and pop singles (Hot 100) charts that Billboard considered the charts to be too similar".  It was published under the title Hot Rhythm & Blues Singles through the issue dated May 29 and Top Selling Rhythm & Blues Singles thereafter.  During that year, 13 different singles topped the chart, based on playlists submitted by radio stations and surveys of retail sales outlets.

When the chart returned from its hiatus, the first number one was "My Girl"  by the Temptations, which held the top spot for six consecutive weeks.  The song was one of a number of the year's chart-toppers to be released on the Motown label and its subsidiaries; Marvin Gaye, the Supremes and the Four Tops also reached the peak position in 1965 with singles released on the Detroit-based label.  Motown, founded by Berry Gordy Jr in 1959, had released its first million-selling single two years later, and would go on to become one of the most successful and influential labels of the 20th century and bring unprecedented levels of mainstream success to black music.

The Four Tops had the year's longest-running number one, spending nine consecutive weeks atop the chart with "I Can't Help Myself (Sugar Pie Honey Bunch)".  James Brown was the act with the highest total number of weeks atop the chart during the year; he spent eight weeks at number one between August and October with "Papa's Got a Brand New Bag (Part 1)"  and a further four weeks at number one with "I Got You (I Feel Good)", which reached number one in the issue of Billboard dated December 4 and stayed there for the remainder of the year.  Brown, nicknamed "the Godfather of Soul" is regarded as one of the most influential black musicians of all time and one of the most successful acts in the history of Billboards R&B singles chart, with more than 100 of his songs having entered the listing.  Marvin Gaye was the only other act to achieve more than one R&B number one in 1965, but both "I'll Be Doggone" and "Ain't That Peculiar" spent just a single week in the top spot.

Chart history

References

1965
1965 record charts
1965 in American music